The Myanmar national cricket team is the team that represents the country of Myanmar in international cricket matches. It has been an affiliate member of the International Cricket Council (ICC) since 2006 and an associate member since 2017.

In April 2018, the ICC decided to grant full Twenty20 International (T20I) status to all its members. Therefore, all Twenty20 matches played between Myanmar and other ICC members after 1 January 2019 will be a full T20I.

History

British rule
Cricket in Myanmar dates back to when Burma was a province of British India. The British brought the game there, as they did to the rest of India, and the game progressed to the level where the Marylebone Cricket Club played two two-day first class matches there on a tour to India in 1926/1927. The first of these was played at the Gymkhana ground in Rangoon against a Rangoon Gymkhana cricket team. That game was drawn with the MCC on top after forcing the home side to follow-on. The second game was against the Burma team themselves at the BAA Ground, also in Rangoon. The MCC won this game restricting Burma to low scores in both their innings, and only having to chase 7 runs to win in their second innings. These remains the country's only first class games.

Reemergence
Following independence cricket remained very much a minority sport in Myanmar, and was nowhere to be seen between 1988 and 1995. In 2002 the game was seeing a resurgence, with a seven team league organised by former Bengal first class player Naresh Kumar , with some former first class players taking part in games attended by around 250 people. Cricket has also been featured on TV news reports. The Myanmar Cricket Federation received a visit from the ICC in 2004 and became an affiliate member of the organisation in 2006. The game is currently played primarily by ex-pats, but the game has recently been introduced into schools.

2006 ACC Trophy
Just two months after gaining ICC membership, Myanmar headed to Malaysia to take part in the 2006 ACC Trophy for the first time. They had a very poor tournament, with a series of heavy defeats to Kuwait (by 9 wickets in 10 overs), to Hong Kong (by 422 runs, with Myanmar being bowled out for 20) and to Bhutan (by 9 wickets in 6.5 overs; Bhutan had also received heavy defeats in their previous matches).

The nadir of their tournament came against Nepal, where Myanmar were bowled out for just 10 off 12.1 overs after losing the toss and being sent in; no batsman scored more than one, the innings included five ducks, and extras top scored with five (three leg byes and two wides). Nepal hit three off the first ball, followed by three wides that went for five, and then hit another three from the second legitimate delivery to win by ten wickets. Some critics called it the greatest mismatch in the history of international cricket, and the score of 10 is the lowest in any level of men's international cricket.

2009–present
With the separation of the ACC Trophy into Elite and Challenge divisions, Myanmar have since competed in the Challenge divisions in both 2009, in which they came last, and 2010. Despite the cricket being of a lesser quality than the Elite division, Myanmar have continued to suffer from heavy defeats.

In August 2017, Myanmar played cricket at the 2017 Southeast Asian Games after a five-year absence from international cricket. In the 50-over tournament, they won only one out of four matches, defeating Indonesia by four wickets. This was Myanmar's first ever victory in international cricket. In the 20-over tournament, they lost both their games.

Tournament history

ACC Eastern Region T20
 2018: 3rd place
 2020: Did not participate

Records
For a list of selected international matches played by Myanmar, see Cricket Archive.

References

External links
ACC Myanmar page

Cricket in Myanmar
National cricket teams
Myanmar in international cricket
Cricket